Centralia High School is a public high school located in Centralia, Washington. Centralia High School is a part of the Centralia School District and remains as the only high school in the district. 

The school opened in 1909 as a regular 9th-12 public high school. In 2017, Centralia passed a $74m bond that allowed the complete remodelozation of CHS. the original high school was torn down and the new facility was finished during the fall of 2020.

History
Centralia High School was built in 1909.  The current Centralia High School building is the second to bear the name. the first senior class graduated in 1970. In 2017, voters in Centralia passed a $74 million bond that  allowed the complete remodel and modernization of Centralia High School in two phases—-Phase 1 and Phase 2. The first Phase was completed by the fall of 2019. Phase 2 was completed in March 2020 and included the instrumental and vocal rehearsal rooms, art department, wood shop and metal shop, commons, and performing arts center. The entire building was fully finished by the fall of 2020.

Administration
As of the 2022-2022 school year, the current principal of Centralia High School is Scot Embrey. Mr Ahern serves as the athletic director. Additional assistant principals and counselors include Mike Stratton, Michael Vanbuskirk and Jim Parker.

Athletics
The mascot of Centralia High School is the Tiger.
Centralia High School is a member of the WIAA (Washington Interscholastic Activities Association) in the 2A Evergreen Conference.  During the Fall season the school sanctions the following sports: Cheerleading, Football, Girls' Soccer, Cross Country, Boys' Tennis, Boys' Golf, Girls' Swimming, Volleyball. Winter season includes: Cheerleading, Wrestling, Girls' Basketball and Boys' Basketball, Vocal and Instrumental Solo and Ensemble contest. The Spring season includes: Baseball, Boys' Soccer, Fastpitch, Girls' Golf, Girls' Tennis and Track.

 Academic State Championships:

 1979, 2000, 2005, 2014 Boys Basketball
 1983 Girls Cross Country
 1980, 1986 Fastpitch Softball
 1997, 1999, 1998, 2000 Girls Soccer
 2001, 2007, 2008 Football
 2006, 2013 Boys Golf
 1984 Girls Slowpitch Softball
 1983,2007 Girls Swimming
 2006, 2007, 2008 Boys Track & Field
 2003, 2010, 2011 Cheer Girls
 2015 Girls Golf
 2017 Boys/Girls Cross Country
 2000, 2018 Girls Basketball
 2015, 2017, 2019 Volleyball

Notable alumni
 Marcus O'Day (born 1897) American physicist 
 Charlie Albright (born 1988), Classical pianist
 Calvin Armstrong (born 1982), NFL player
 Angela Meade (born 1977), opera singer
 Lyle Overbay (born 1977), MLB player 
 Soren Johnson (born 1976), Video game designer and programmer
 Detlef Schrempf (born 1963), NBA player 
 Bob Coluccio (born 1951), MLB player
 Merce Cunningham (1919-2009), Modern dancer
 Howard Costigan (1904-1985), political activist
 C.D. (Clyde) Moore, 2 star general USAF
Sandy Marth Hill (born 1946), television journalist
Gabriel Genzel  (born 2005), Professional Harry Styles impersonator 
Thoust Mother

References

External links
CHS Centralia High School website

High schools in Lewis County, Washington
Centralia, Washington
Public high schools in Washington (state)